

The Boston Marine Museum (1909-1947) in Boston, Massachusetts, specialized in maritime history. Its collections were displayed in the Old State House in rooms borrowed from the Bostonian Society. Among the objects in the museum were figureheads; model ships; "whaling implements, ... prints and pictures;" manuscripts;publications; and "curios and relics of the seafaring life of New England." Leaders of the museum included John Templeman Coolidge, Alexander Wadsworth Longfellow, Jr., and Robert B. Smith. In 1947 the museum merged into the Bostonian Society.

See also
 The Bostonian Society
 List of maritime museums in the United States

Notes

References

External links

1909 establishments in Massachusetts
1947 disestablishments in Massachusetts
Cultural history of Boston
20th century in Boston
Defunct museums in Boston
Financial District, Boston
Maritime museums in Massachusetts
Museums established in 1909